Essar is a 1984 album by American singer Smokey Robinson. It was produced and arranged by Robinson with Reginald "Sonny" Burke. The album was released on the Motown sub-label Tamla. The album's title is a pun on the initials of Robinson's name.

Reception

The album only peaked at #141 on Billboard pop charts, and at #35 on R&B charts. "And I Don't Love You" peaked at #106 Billboard and #33 R&B charts, and "I Can't Find" at #109 Billboard and #41 R&B charts.

Although the 12" B-side  of "And I Don't Love You"  Larry Levan's Instrumental (Dub) became a House Music classic in the late 2000s.

William Ruhlmann gave 2 out of 5 stars on AllMusic, addressing it as "the low point" in Robinson's career and holding Sonny Burke's dominating synthesiser play responsible. Where Robert Christgau rated it as B+, acknowledging that there are  "fillers", but concluding with "one thing you can say about Smokey's filler that you can't say about anybody else's--Smokey's singing it".

Track listing
All tracks composed by William "Smokey" Robinson; except where indicated

Side A
"And I Don't Love You" – 5:20
"Train of Thought" – 4:55
"I Can't Find" – 6:15
"Why Are You Running From My Love" (Scott V. Smith, Stephen Tavani) – 4:20

Side B
"Gone Forever (Theme from the motion picture Cry of the City" (Mark Kevin Davis) – 3:10
"Close Encounters of the First Kind" – 4:35
 "Little Girl Little Girl" – 5:12
"Girl I'm Standing There" – 4:25
"Driving Thru Life in the Fast Lane" (Milton Brown, Snuff Garrett, Steve Dorff) – 3:32

Personnel
 William "Smokey" Robinson - lead vocals
 Ivory Davis, Patricia Henley Talbert, Smokey Robinson - backing vocals
 Charles Fearing, Wah Wah Watson, David T. Walker - guitar
 "Ready" Freddie Washington - bass
 Reginald "Sonny" Burke - drums, keyboards, arrangements

Production
 Producers – William "Smokey" Robinson, Jr. and Reginald "Sonny" Burke
 Assistant Mixing Engineers – William "Smokey" Robinson, Jr. and Reginald "Sonny" Burke
 Recording Engineer – Mitchel Delevie
 Mixing and Editing Engineer – Barney Perkins at Kendun Recorders, Burbank, California.
 Editing Assistant – Phillip Walters
 Second Engineers – Fred Law and Jeff DeMorris
 Mastered by Bernie Grundman at Bernie Grundman Mastering, Hollywood, California.
 Contractor – George Annis
 Copyist – Andres Victorin, Music Suite
 Cover Concept – William "Smokey" Robinson
 Photography – Aaron Rapoport
 Art Direction – Johnny Lee

Additional credits:

"And I Don't Love You"
 Yamaha DX7 programming – Clark Spangler
 Assistant Editor – Bob Robitaille

"I Can't Find"
 Cello –  Michael "Jake" Jacobsen
 Concertmaster – Harry Bluestone

"Why Are You Running From My Love"  – Recorded at Mama Jo's, North Hollywood, with:
 Backing vocals – Howard McCrary, Howard Smith and Ivory Davis
 Guitar – James Harrah
 Keyboards – Michael Ruff
 Synthesizer programming – Rhett Lawrence
 LinnDrum Programming – Davis Lynn Coulter and Scott V. Smith
 Engineers – Chris Banninger, Frank Wolf and Win Kutz.
 Second Engineers – Steve Ford and Todd Van Etten
 Producers – Scott V. Smith and Stephen Tavani

"Gone Forever" – Recorded at Golden Sound Studios, Inc., Hollywood with:
 Backing vocals – Allan Rich, Carmen Grillio and Mindy Sterling
 Bass – Lequeint "Duke" Jobe
 Keyboards, synthesizer – Mark Davis
 Oboe – William Green
 Vocal Engineer – Mitchel Delevie
 Rhythm Engineer – Karen Siegel
 Assistant Engineer– Michael Dotson
 Producers – Mark Davis and William "Smokey" Robinson

"Girl I'm Standing There"
 Cello – Michael "Jake" Jacobsen
 Concertmaster – Harry Bluestone
 Rhythm Engineers – Mitchel Delevie and Paul Ring

"Driving Thru Life In The Fast Lane"  
 Backing Vocals – Julia Tillman Waters, Maxine Willard Waters, Oren Waters and Smokey Robinson
 Bass – Joe Chemay
 Drums – John Robinson
 Guitars – Dann Huff and Paul Jackson Jr.
 Keyboards – John Hobbs
 Percussion – Paulinho da Costa
 Trombones – Dick Hyde and Richard Noel
 Trumpets – Gary Grant, Warren Luening and Jerry Hey
 Horns arrangements – Larry Herbstritt
 Rhythm arrangements – Steve Dorff
 Session Coordinator  – Dave Pell
 Engineer – Ed Barton, Gary Singleman and Marv Clamme.
 Producers – Randy Dunlap and Steve Dorff

Essar to Emgee

The cover backside contains a handwritten message: "A note to Emgee: We're really gonna miss you, Essar" – obviously from Smokey Robinson (S.R.) to his colleague Marvin Gaye (M.G.) who was murdered on April 1, 1984.

References

External links
Essar on Discogs

Smokey Robinson albums
1984 albums
Motown albums